Gaffer or Gaffa may refer to:

Media 
 Gaffa (magazine), a Danish music magazine
 The Gaffer (TV series), a British comedy television series of the early 1980s
 Gaffer Gamgee, a hobbit character in J.R.R. Tolkien's Lord of the Rings franchise
 Gaffer, a character in The Muppets
 A nickname used by the perpetrator in the Sheffield incest case

Other uses 
 Gaffer (boss), a British colloquial term for "boss", "foreman" or "old man"
 Gaffer (filmmaking), the head of the electrical/lighting department
 Gaffer District (Corning, New York), a historic district of downtown Corning
 Gaffer tape, or Gaffa tape, a type of adhesive tape
 Gaffer, a person who blows glass
 Gaffer (sailor), of a gaff rig boat

See also